Larkspur station is a Sonoma–Marin Area Rail Transit (SMART) station in Larkspur, California. The terminal station opened to revenue service on December 14, 2019.

History
The rail corridor was established by the North Pacific Coast Railroad, and a nearby stop called Greenbrae was served by Northwestern Pacific Railroad interurban cars between 1903 and 1941.

The land for the station was acquired in 1983 by the Golden Gate Bridge, Highway and Transportation District. Initially part of the original plan for system's full buildout, its opening was delayed to a later date as the line's construction was split into phases. Until the line was extended, shuttle bus service connected the Larkspur Terminal with San Rafael Transit Center.

Test trains on the extension began running on August 23, 2019. A preview excursion served as the station's inauguration on December 13, 2019, and revenue service began the following day.

References

External links

SMART - Larkspur station

Buildings and structures in San Rafael, California
Railway stations in the United States opened in 2019
Sonoma-Marin Area Rail Transit stations in Marin County
San Francisco Bay Trail
Larkspur, California
2019 establishments in California